Rankin Inlet North was a territorial electoral district (riding) for the Legislative Assembly of Nunavut, Canada.

The area is now a part of the Rankin Inlet North-Chesterfield Inlet riding.

Election results

1999 election

2004 election

2008 election

References

External links
Website of the Legislative Assembly of Nunavut

Electoral districts of Kivalliq Region
1999 establishments in Nunavut
2013 disestablishments in Nunavut